Potito Starace and Adrian Ungur were the defending champions, but Starace did not defend his title while Ungur partnering Victor Vlad Cornea lost in the first round. Victor Crivoi and Petru-Alexandru Luncanu won the title beating Ilija Bozoljac and Dušan Lajović in the final 6–4, 6–3.

Seeds

Draw

References
 Main Draw

Sibiu Open - Doubles
Sibiu Open
2015 in Romanian sport